Ari Louis (born March 26, 1983) is an Israeli-American talk show host who came into prominence with the founding of Israel Sports Radio in the summer of 2010.

Personal life 
Louis was born in Phoenix, Arizona, and grew up in Glendale, Arizona, where he attended Horizon Elementary, Landmark Middle School and then eventually Apollo High School. Louis ranks as the most successful alumni of Apollo High School. While in high school, Louis began filming the Ari Louis Show with his friend Matt Turley and cameraman "Gus McDanny", who is actually his brother, Danny Louis, a musician living in Israel. The show was modeled after the Conan O'Brien show.
Louis attended Arizona State University in 2001 and studied online at the Walter Cronkite School of Journalism and Mass Communication, eventually graduating with a degree in Religious Studies. Louis suffered a great deal of anti-Semitism and as a result focused much of his attention in college to Judaism and Zionism.

While in college, Louis founded the Chabad at Arizona State University and was the vice-president of ASU for Israel. During that time, Louis filmed his first broadcast television show Louis Live on a public access station in Tucson, Arizona.

Louis graduated in 2003 and worked as a teacher.

Israeli broadcasting career 
In 2008, Louis moved to Israel; although he figured his broadcasting career was over, his Zionist dream helped propel him to move. However, Louis's broadcasting career was not over. In 2009 he teamed with Andrew Gershman to host a talk show on the Jerusalem-based station Rusty Mike Radio. Entitled the Andy and Ari Show, they discussed American sports, becoming the highest-rated show on the station.

Louis and Gershman were approached by Joshua Halickman "the Sports Rabbi" to start Israel Sports Radio in summer of 2010 to much fanfare.

After becoming an owner at the age of 28, Louis's legend grew throughout Israel, with Sirius and Fox courting him. Louis chose to remain in Israel rather than relocate.

In 2013, Louis was approached by TLV1.fm, a Tel-Aviv based internet radio station to broadcast Louis Live Sports, which he hosted for two years.

Later that year, Louis was approached by Arutz Sheva - Israel National News, where he hosted Is It Prophesy?, a call-in talk show that compared contemporary headlines with Biblical verses. Guests included Rabbi David Katz, Rabbi Ken Spiro and others.

Since 2013 Louis has been writing a blog for the Times of Israel which focuses on both sports and politics.

In 2014 and 2015 Louis organized and hosted the Jerusalem Festivus Comedy Festival. Proceeds went to charity.

In summer 2015, Louis inaugurated the new venture Israel Sports and News Radio.

References 

Category:Radio stations in Israel

1983 births
Living people
Arizona State University alumni
Israeli radio presenters
People from Glendale, Arizona
Israeli broadcasters
Radio in Israel